New My Fair Princess is a 2011 Chinese television drama written by Taiwanese novelist Chiung Yao (with help by her assistant Huang Su-yuan) and produced by Hunan Broadcasting System. It is a remake of the 1998–1999 smash hit My Fair Princess, and directed by the same 2 directors from My Fair Princess III (2003). Akin to the original, main cast members were almost all unestablished, although lead actresses Li Sheng and Hai Lu were already 27 and 26 years old in 2010 when it was shot. Ruby Lin from the original as well as Qin Lan and Zang Jinsheng from My Fair Princess III made guest appearances.

Despite a huge budget compared to the original, including over ¥4.5 million (roughly US$0.7 million) on costumes alone, the series received largely negative reviews after it was broadcast.

Parts
The drama is composed of three parts.
 Part 1: Flying Swallow (燕兒翩翩飛): episodes 1 to 36
 Part 2: Blowing Wind (風兒陣陣吹): episodes 37 to 74
 Part 3: Wandering People (人兒何處歸): episodes 75 to 98

Cast

 Li Sheng as Xiaoyanzi
 Zhang Rui as Yongqi
 Benjamin Schwartz as Banjieming (Benjamin)
 Hai Lu as Xia Ziwei
 Li Jiahang as Fu Erkang
 Chiu Hsinchih as Qianlong Emperor
 Sheren Tang as the empress
 Leanne Liu as the empress dowager
 Zanilia Zhao as Princess Qing'er
 Gao Ziqi as Xiao Jian
 Sun Yaoqi as Jinsuo
 Lu Hong as Fu Ertai
 Fang Qingzhuo as Wet-Nurse Rong
 Wang Jinduo as Liu Qing
 Zhou Fang as Liu Hong
 Liu Xiaoye as Consort Ling
 Zhuang Qingning as Consort Yu
 Madina Memet as Hanxiang
 Zhang Danfeng as Mai'erdan (Merdan)
 Chai Biyun as Princess Saiya
 Kan Qingzi as Xinrong
 Liu Changwei as Chang Shou
 Yu Yingying as Mingyue
 Ma Xiangyi as Caixia
 Qu Aohui as Xiaodengzi
 Zhang Zhuowen as Xiaozhuozi
 Lei Zhenyu as Fu Lun
 Chen Huijuan as Fu Lun's wife
 Xu Yazhou as Lang Shining
 Gang Yi as Ji Xiaolan
 Xing Hanqing as Fu Heng
 Yang Fengyu as E Min
 Xin Xin as Xiaowenzi
 Chen Muyi as Xiaochongzi
 Li Zixing as Xiaoguizi
 Han Chao as Xiaoshunzi
 Wang Zi as Xiaoluzi
 Xu Tianchen as Xiaohuangzi
 Chen Yayun as Xiaolüzi
 Ding Li as Xiaolanzi
 Xie Zhongling as Cailian
Zang Jinsheng as Liang Tinggui
 Wang Heming as Master Zhuang
 Nige Mutu as Ali Hezhuo (Ali Khoja)
 Wang Jianxin as Qike'er
 Yang Quanjing as Sai Wei
 Ye Dao as Sai Guang
 Yan Qinglong as Sai Hu
 Yu Chengchuan as Sai Bao
 Li Xiaoyan as Wet-Nurse Gui
 Cao Shan as Shuangxi
 Zhou Jingjing as Lamei
 Zhang Xinyue as Dongxue
 Cheng Jinan as Cuihuan
 Sheng Tianling as Peiyu
 Hu Qiunan as Zhen'er
 Weng Wenqian as Cui'er
 Qian Jing as Mei'er
 Luo Shujie as Ying'er
 Yang Qing as Jixiang
 Huang Xiaolan as Ruyi
 Zheng Qiongxiao as Xiaoxiao
 Yang Mengdi as Zhaizhai
 Mou Xing as Qiutian
 Xu Yuhan as Xiaodouzi
 Kang Shengwen as Xiaohuzi
 Chen Shidan as Baby Girl Dou
 Kong Biyu as Grandma Wang
 Liu Huanying as Nanny Sun
 Chen Heng as Third Princess
 Chai Wei as Seventh Princess
 Mi Dou as Ninth Princess
 Fu Tao as Eleventh Prince
 Wu Tiezheng as Twelfth Prince
 Zhu Jiazhen as Zhu'er
 Ai Ru as Jinlingzi
 Chen Zhuo as Yinlingzi
 Yu Zikuan as Guan Bao
 Su Mei as Guan Bao's wife
 Gao Sen as Eunuch Pu
 Wang Chunyuan as Imperial Doctor Hu
 Yan Jingning as Imperial Doctor Li
 Han Xiquan as Imperial Doctor Zhong
 Chen Fusheng as Balang
 Yin Zhefei as Brother Ou
 Mao Jianping as Brother Ou's wife
 Shen Baoping as Liu Yixin
 Xu Zhenbin as Lujia
 Wang Liangzhu as Kaluma
 Li Chenyin as Langka
 Jenny Zhang as Hu Ruolan
 Wang Kun as Gao Yuan / Gao Da
 Zong Fengyan as Gao Liang / Gao Ming
 Ruby Lin as Xia Yuhe
 Gao Ziqi as Xiao Zhihang
 Qin Lan as Du Xueyin

Reception
In Taiwan, where the first 2 seasons of the original series both recorded double-digit ratings, the remake only managed 0.8 in the first week, ranking last among Taiwan's major channels. Ratings eventually improved to 2.0 by the last week, tying for third place. In Mainland China, ratings mostly ranked first nationally, even though the average ratings of 1.5 and audience shares of 8.3% also hardly compared to the original's numbers (more than 50% audience shares) more than a decade ago. Reports suggest that many were only watching it to see how "terrible" it was, after initial negative reviews. With the exception of Ruby Lin who received strong support by nostalgic fans of the original, the actors were harshly criticized and ridiculed on social media. A message on Sina Weibo that was re-posted over 60,000 times read "When I watched the Old My Fair Princess then, I always hoped Xiaoyanzi and Ziwei could finish off the empress and Wet Nurse Rong; when I watch the New My Fair Princess now, I just hope the empress and Wet Nurse Rong finish off Xiaoyanzi and Ziwei as quickly as possible." A Taiwanese kuso version mocking a scene's dialogue also went viral, generating more viewers than the series, infuriating Chiung Yao. After the last episode aired in China, Chiung Yao wrote on her Sina Weibo account to the large number of disappointed critics: "My heart hurts. The distance between us is too large."

Awards
2011 Huading Awards
 Won – Sheren Tang, Best Supporting Actress in a Chinese TV Series

See also
 Flowers in Fog – a 2013 Chiung Yao series also starring Li Sheng and Zhang Rui

References

External links

2011 Chinese television series debuts
2011 Chinese television series endings
Television series set in the Qing dynasty
Television series about orphans
Television shows based on works by Chiung Yao
Hunan Television dramas
Chinese comedy-drama television series